The following is a partial list of notable Southern Virginia University people. It includes alumni, professors, and others associated with Southern Virginia University.

Presidents
 Roy Kinneer Patteson, Jr., 1970–1972, Ancient language scholar; Ph.D. Duke University; Th.M. Duke University; B.D. Union Theological Seminary; B.A. University of Richmond.
 John Ripley, 1992-1997, U.S. Marine Colonel, Vietnam War combat veteran, war hero
Designated Southern Virginia University in 2001.
 E. Curtis Fawson, 1999-2003
 Monte S. Nyman, 2003-2004
 Rodney K. Smith, 2004-2011
 Paul K. Sybrowsky, 2012-2014
 Reed N Wilcox, 2014-present

Faculty
 Jeff Benedict, investigative reporter/author
 Orson Scott Card, author of novel Ender's Game
 Paul S. Edwards
 Daniel J. Fairbanks
 Ed Mulitalo, former American football player who played 10 years in the NFL and earned a Super Bowl ring with the Baltimore Ravens in Super Bowl XXXV
 Debra H. Sowell, former secretary and board member of the Society of Dance History Scholars

Board of trustees
 Kent Colton, senior scholar, Harvard University Joint Center for Housing Studies; BYU Romney Institute Advisory Board
 Ron Jones, chairman and CEO of Sealy Corporation
 Ardeth Kapp, former general president of the Young Women Organization
 Chieko Okazaki, former member of the Relief Society General Presidency
 Dave Ulrich, a writer, speaker, management consultant and university professor who in 2001 was ranked the #1 Management Educator and Guru by BusinessWeek

Alumni
 Beezie Madden, an American show jumping competitor and Olympic medalist

References